Annabella Stropparo (born 4 July 1968) is an Italian former cyclist. She competed in the women's cross-country event at the 1996 Summer Olympics.

References

External links
 

1968 births
Living people
Italian female cyclists
Italian mountain bikers
Olympic cyclists of Italy
Cyclists at the 1996 Summer Olympics
Place of birth missing (living people)
People from Bassano del Grappa
Cyclists from the Province of Vicenza